Tela is a municipality in Honduras.

Tela may also refer to:

Biology and medicine
 A tela (from Latin, meaning a web, something woven, or a layer of tissue like those, especially a thin reticular membrane)
 Tela chorioidea, a layer of tissue in the brain
 Tela chorioidea of the third ventricle 
 Tela chorioidea of the fourth ventricle 
 Tela subserosa (or just subserosa), a layer of connective tissue between the serosa and the muscular layer in various organs
 Tela submucosa (or just submucosa), a layer of connective tissue between the mucosa and the muscular layer in various parts of the digestive, respiratory, and genitourinary tracts

Places
 Tela, a Romanian village in Bata, Arad, a commune in Arad County
 Tela River (Río Tela), a river in Honduras

Other
 Television and Entertainment Licensing Authority of Hong Kong, China
 Tela (rapper), an American rap performer from Memphis, Tennessee
 "Tela", a song by the American rock band Phish from the 1987 album The Man Who Stepped into Yesterday

See also

Tola (disambiguation)